A ring road (also known as circular road, beltline, beltway, circumferential (high)way, loop, bypass or orbital) is a road or a series of connected roads encircling a town, city, or country. The most common purpose of a ring road is to assist in reducing traffic volumes in the urban centre, such as by offering an alternate route around the city for drivers who do not need to stop in the city core.  Ring roads can also serve to connect suburbs to each other, allowing efficient travel between them.

Nomenclature

The name "ring road" is used for the majority of metropolitan circumferential routes in Europe, such as the Berliner Ring, the Brussels Ring, the Amsterdam Ring, the Boulevard Périphérique around Paris and the Leeds Inner and Outer ring roads. Australia, Pakistan and India also use the term ring road, as in Melbourne's Western Ring Road, Lahore's Lahore Ring Road and Hyderabad's Outer Ring Road. In Canada the term is the most commonly used, with "orbital" also used, but to a much lesser extent.

In Europe and Australia, some ring roads, particularly longer ones of motorway standard, are known as "orbital motorways". Examples are the London Orbital (generally known as the M25; 188 km), Sydney Orbital Network (110 km), and Rome Orbital (68 km).

In the United States, many ring roads are called beltlines, beltways, or loops, such as the Capital Beltway around Washington, D.C. Some ring roads, such as Washington's Capital Beltway, use "Inner Loop" and "Outer Loop" terminology for directions of travel, since cardinal (compass) directions cannot be signed uniformly around the entire loop.  The term 'ring road' is occasionally – and inaccurately – used interchangeably with the term 'bypass'.

Background

Bypasses around many large and small towns were built in many areas when many old roads were upgraded to four-lane status in the 1930s to 1950s, such as those along the Old National Road (now generally U.S. 40 or Interstate 70) in the United States, leaving the old road in place to serve the town or city, but allowing through travelers to continue on a wider, faster, and safer route.

Construction of fully circumferential ring roads has generally occurred more recently, beginning in the 1960s in many areas, when the U.S. Interstate Highway System and similar-quality roads elsewhere were designed.  Ring roads have now been built around numerous cities and metropolitan areas, including cities with multiple ring roads, irregularly shaped ring roads, and ring roads made up of various other long-distance roads.

London has three ring roads (the M25 motorway, the North and South Circular roads, and the Inner Ring Road). Birmingham also has three ring roads which consist of the Birmingham Box; the A4540, commonly known as the Middleway; and the A4040, the Outer Ring Road. Birmingham once had a fourth ring road, the A4400. This has been partially demolished and downgraded to improve traffic flow into the city. Other British cities have two: (Leeds, Sheffield, Norwich and Glasgow). Columbus, OH and San Antonio, TX, in the United States, also each have two, while Houston, Texas will have three official ring roads (not including the downtown freeway loop). Some cities have far more Beijing, for example, has six ring roads, simply numbered in increasing order from the city center (though skipping #1), while Moscow has five, three innermost (Central Squares of Moscow, Boulevard Ring and Garden Ring) corresponding to the concentric lines of fortifications around the ancient city, and the two outermost (MKAD and Third Ring) built in the twentieth century, though, confusingly, the Third Ring was built last.

Geographical constraints can complicate the construction of a complete ring road. For example, the Baltimore Beltway in Maryland crosses Baltimore Harbor on a high arch bridge, and much of the partially completed Stockholm Ring Road in Sweden runs through tunnels or over long bridges. Some towns or cities on sea coasts or near rugged mountains cannot have a full ring road. Examples of such partial ring roads are Dublin's ring road; and, in the USA, Interstate 287, mostly in New Jersey (bypassing New York City), and Interstate 495 around Boston, none of which completely circles these seaport cities.

In other cases, adjacent international boundaries may prevent ring road completion. Construction of a true ring road around Detroit is effectively blocked by its location on the border with Canada; although constructing a route mostly or entirely outside city limits is technically feasible, a true ring around Detroit would necessarily pass through Canada, and so Interstate 275 and Interstate 696 together bypass but do not encircle the city. Sometimes, the presence of significant natural or historical areas limits route options, as for the long-proposed Outer Beltway around Washington, D.C., where options for a new western Potomac River crossing are limited by a nearly continuous corridor of heavily visited scenic, natural, and historical landscapes in the Potomac River Gorge and adjacent areas.

When referring to a road encircling a capital city, the term "beltway" can also have a political connotation, as in the American term "Inside the Beltway", derived metonymically from the Capital Beltway encircling Washington, D.C.

Impact 
Ring roads have been criticised for inducing demand, leading to more car journeys being taken and thus higher levels of pollution being created. By creating easy access by car to large areas of land, they can also act as a catalyst for development, leading to urban sprawl and car-centric planning. Ring roads have also been criticised for splitting communities and being difficult to navigate for pedestrians and cyclists.

Examples

Most orbital motorways (or beltways) are purpose-built major highways around a town or city, typically without either signals or road or railroad crossings.  In the United States, beltways are commonly parts of the Interstate Highway System.  Similar roads in the United Kingdom are often called "orbital motorways".  Although the terms "ring road" and "orbital motorway" are sometimes used interchangeably, "ring road" often indicates a circumferential route formed from one or more existing roads within a city or town, with the standard of road being anything from an ordinary city street up to motorway level. An excellent example of this is London's North Circular/South Circular ring roads, which are largely made up of (mainly congested) ordinary city streets.

In some cases, a circumferential route is formed by the combination of a major through highway and a similar-quality loop route that extends out from the parent road, later reconnecting with the same highway.  Such loops not only function as a bypass for through traffic, but also to serve outlying suburbs. In the United States, an Interstate highway loop is usually designated by a three-digit number beginning with an even digit before the two-digit number of its parent interstate. Interstate spurs, on the other hand, generally have three-digit numbers beginning with an odd digit.

United States

Circumferential highways are prominent features in or near many large cities in the United States. In many cases, such as Interstate 285 in Atlanta, Georgia, circumferential highways serve as a bypass while other highways pass directly through the city center. In other cases, a primary Interstate highway passes around a city on one side, with a connecting loop Interstate bypassing the city on the other side, together forming a circumferential route, as with I-93 and I-495 in the area of Lawrence, Massachusetts.  However, if a primary Interstate passes through a city and a loop bypasses it on only one side (as in the Wilmington, Delaware, area), no fully circumferential route is provided. Within cities, ring roads sometimes have local nicknames; these include Washington DC's Interstate 495 (The "Capital Beltway"), Interstate 270 in Columbus, Ohio (The "Outerbelt"), and Interstate 285 in Atlanta (The "Perimeter").

Route numbering is challenging when a through highway and a loop bypass together form a circumferential ring road.  Since neither of the highways involved is circumferential itself, either dual signage or two (or more) route numbers is needed. The history of signage on the Capital Beltway around Washington, D.C., is instructive here. Interstate 95, a major through highway along the U.S. East Coast, was originally planned as a through-the-city route there, with the Beltway encircling the city as I-495.  The portion of I-95 entering the city from the south was soon completed (and so signed), primarily by adapting an existing major highway, but the planned extension of I-95 through residential areas northward to the Beltway was long delayed, and eventually abandoned, leaving the eastern portion of the Beltway as the best Interstate-quality route for through traffic.

This eastern portion of the Beltway was then redesignated from I-495 to I-95, leaving the I-495 designation only on the western portion, and the completed part of the planned Interstate inside the Beltway was redesignated as a spur, I-395.  A few years later, the resulting confusion from different route numbers on the circumferential Beltway was resolved by restoring I-495 signage for the entire Beltway, with dual signage for I-95 for the highway's concurrent use as a through Interstate on its eastern portion.

The longest complete beltway in the United States is Sam Houston Tollway, an  loop in Texas that forms a complete beltway around the Metro Houston area.

The longest complete belt road in the United States is Hawaii Belt Road, a  belt in Hawaii that forms a complete belt road around Hawaii Island. 

 
Other major U.S. cities with such a beltway superhighway:
 Atlanta, Georgia—Interstate 285
 Athens, Georgia - Georgia State Route 10 Loop/Athens Perimeter
 Augusta, Georgia/North Augusta, South Carolina—Interstate 520, and Interstate 20
 Baltimore—Interstate 695 including the Francis Scott Key Bridge
 Boston—Route 128/Interstate 95 and Interstate 93/U.S. Route 1 form an inner beltway, and Interstate 495 forms an outer beltway
 Birmingham, Alabama—Interstate 459 and proposed/under construction Interstate 422
 Charlotte, North Carolina—Interstate 485, and Interstate 277
 Chicago—Interstate 294
 Cincinnati—Interstate 275
 Cleveland—Interstate 271 and Interstate 480 
 Columbia, South Carolina—Interstate 26, Interstate 77, and Interstate 20
 Columbus, Ohio—Interstate 270
 Dallas—Downtown Circulator, Interstate 20/Interstate 635/Loop 12, and President George Bush Turnpike
 Denver—(Partial) Interstate 70, Colorado State Highway 470, and E-470
 Des Moines, Iowa-Interstate 35/Interstate 80, U.S. Route 69, Iowa Highway 5
 Detroit—Interstate 275 and Interstate 696
 Dothan, Alabama−Ross Clark Circle; U.S. Route 231, U.S. Route 431, U.S. Route 84, and Alabama State Route 210
 El Paso, Texas – Loop 375
 Fort Wayne, Indiana—Interstate 69 and Interstate 469
 Fort Worth, Texas—Interstate 20/Interstate 820
 Greensboro, North Carolina—Interstate 85, Interstate 840, Interstate 73
 Hawaii Island—Hawaii Belt Road
 Houston—Interstate 610, Beltway 8, and the Grand Parkway.
 Indianapolis—Interstate 465
 Jacksonville, Florida—Interstate 295
 Kansas City, Kansas/Kansas City, Missouri—Interstate 435
 Lansing, Michigan—Interstate 96, Interstate 69, U.S Route 127 and Interstate 496
 Las Vegas—Interstate 215
 Lexington—KY-4
 Los Angeles—Interstate 405
 Louisville- Interstate 264, Interstate 265
 Lubbock, Texas—Loop 289
 Memphis, Tennessee—Interstate 240 and Interstate 40 (Inner Beltway); Interstate 269 (Outer Beltway)
 Minneapolis/Saint Paul, Minnesota—Interstate 94, Interstate 494, and Interstate 694
 Nashville, Tennessee—Downtown Loop (Interstate 24, Interstate 40, and Interstate 65), Interstate 440, and Briley Parkway
 Oklahoma City—Interstate 44, Kickapoo Turnpike, Interstate 40, Interstate 240, OK-152 and John Kilpatrick Turnpike
 New York City—Interstate 287
 Norfolk, Virginia/Hampton Roads—Hampton Roads Beltway; Interstate 64 and Interstate 664
 Philadelphia—Interstate 476, Interstate 276 and Interstate 95 around Philadelphia 
 Philadelphia/Camden—Interstate 676 and Schuylkill Expressway around Center City and Camden 
 Philadelphia/Camden/Wilmington—Interstate 95 in PA/DE and Interstate 295
 Phoenix, Arizona—Arizona State Route 101 and Arizona State Route 202
 Pittsburgh—Interstate 79, the mainline Pennsylvania Turnpike and the Allegheny County belt system. (all de facto or, in the case of the latter, largely on surface streets) The Southern Beltway, which is currently under construction, will serve as a true beltway.
 Portland, Oregon—Interstate 405 and Interstate 205
 Raleigh, North Carolina—Interstate 540/North Carolina State Route 540 (Raleigh Outer Loop) and Interstate 440 (Raleigh Beltline)
 Richmond/Petersburg, Virginia—Interstate 295
 Saint Louis, Missouri—Interstate 255 and Interstate 270
 Salt Lake City—Interstate 215
 San Antonio—Downtown Circulator, Interstate 410, and Loop 1604
 San Diego—California State Route 54, California State Route 125, California State Route 52
 San Francisco Bay Area—Interstate 280 and Interstate 680
 Scranton, Pennsylvania—Interstate 81 and Interstate 476
 Toledo, Ohio—Interstate 475 (Ohio), Interstate 75, The Ohio Turnpike and Interstate 280

There are other U.S. superhighway beltway systems that consist of multiple routes that require multiple interchanges and thus do not provide true ring routes. Two designated examples are the Capital Beltway around Harrisburg, Pennsylvania using Interstate 81, Interstate 83, and Pennsylvania Route 581 and “The Bypass” around South Bend, Indiana using Interstate 80, Interstate 90, U.S. Route 31, and Indiana State Road 331.

Canada

Edmonton, Alberta, has two ring roads. Yellowhead Trail forms the northern section, Wayne Gretzky Drive/75 Street forms the eastern section, Whitemud Drive forms the southern and longest section, and 170 Street forms the western and shortest section. Whitemud Drive is the only section that is a true controlled-access highway, while Yellowhead Trail and Wayne Gretzky Drive have interchanges and intersections and are therefore both limited-access roads. 170 Street and 75 Street are merely large arterial roads with intersections only. It is a freeway for its entire  length, and was built to reduce inner-city traffic congestion, created a bypass of Yellowhead Trail, and has improved the movement of goods and services across Edmonton and the surrounding areas. It was completed in October 2016 as the first free-flowing orbital road in Canada.

Stoney Trail is a ring road that circles the majority of Calgary, Alberta. The west portion of the freeway is currently under construction.

Winnipeg, Manitoba, has a ring road which is called the Perimeter Highway. It is designated as Manitoba Highway 101 on the north, northwest and east sides and as Manitoba Highway 100 on the south and southwest sides. The majority of it is a four-lane divided expressway. It has a second ring road, planned since the 1950s and not yet completed, called the Suburban Beltway. It consists of several roads—Lagimodière Boulevard, Bishop Grandin Boulevard, the Fort Garry Bridge, the Moray Bridge, William R Clement Parkway, Chief Peguis Trail and the Kildonan Bridge.

Saskatoon, Saskatchewan, has a ring road named Circle Drive. It is designated as Saskatchewan Highway 16 on the east and north, and as Saskatchewan Highway 11 on the south, and simply as Circle Drive on the west.

Regina, Saskatchewan has a partial ring road that is named Ring Road; however, due to the city's urban growth since the road was originally constructed, it no longer functions as a true ring road and has instead come to be used partially for local arterial traffic. The Regina Bypass, a new partial ring road, has replaced it.

Hamilton, Ontario, has the Lincoln M. Alexander Parkway, Highway 403 and the Red Hill Valley Parkway which form a ring on three sides.

Sudbury, Ontario, has a partial ring road consisting of the Southwest and Southeast Bypasses segment of Highway 17, and the Northwest Bypass segment of Highway 144.

Europe

Most major cities in Europe are served by a ring road that either circles the inner core of their metropolitan areas or the outer borders of the city proper or both. In major transit hubs, such as the Île-de-France region surrounding Paris and the Frankfurt area, major national highways converge just outside city limits before forming one of several routes of an urban network of roads circling the city. Unlike in United States, route numbering is not a challenge on European ring roads as routes merge to form the single designated road. However, exit and road junction access can be challenging due to the complexity of other routes branching from or into the ring road.

One of the most renowned ring roads is the Vienna Ring Road (Ringstraße), a grand boulevard constructed in the mid-19th century and filled with representative buildings. Due to its unique architectural beauty and history, it has also been called the "Lord of the ring roads", and is declared by UNESCO as part of Vienna's World Heritage Site.

Major European cities that are served by a ring road or ring road system:

 Amsterdam – A10 motorway
 Antwerp – R1
 Athens – Attiki Odos (Motorway A6)
 Barcelona – Ronda de Dalt and Ronda Litoral (inner city), B30 and B40 (metropolitan region)
 Belgrade – Belgrade bypass
 Berlin – Bundesautobahn 100 (inner city), Bundesautobahn 111 (city proper), Bundesautobahn 10 (inner metropolitan region)
 Birmingham – A4400 (Birmingham Queensway); A4540 (Birmingham Middleway); A4040 (Birmingham Outer Circle)
 Bologna – Tangenziale di Bologna (periphery half-ring road) and Viali di Circonvallazione (full and inner ring road: around the city center)
 Bratislava - D4 motorway (Bratislavsky okruch)
 Brussels – Petite ceinture (inner city), R22 (outer districts), Brussels Ring (city proper)
 Bucharest – Centura București
 Budapest – M0
 Caen – Périphérique
 Catania – Tangenziale di Catania
 Charleroi – R9 (inner city), R3 (inner metropolitan region)
 Cologne – Cologne Ring (inner city), Cologne Beltway (metropolitan region)
 Copenhagen – Ring 2, Ring 3, Ring 4, Motorring 3 and Motorring 4
 Dublin – M50 motorway
 Frankfurt – Bundesautobahn 66 and Bundesautobahn 661 (city proper), Frankfurter Kreuz system (inner metropolitan region)
 Ghent - R4
 Glasgow – Glasgow Inner Ring Road (inner city)
 Hamburg – Inner Ring (inner city) 
 Helsinki – Ring I, Ring III
 Herning – Messemotorvejen, Messemotorvejens forlængelse, Sindingvej, Midtjyske Motorvej
 Kosice - Ring road 1 (MO 1) Ring road 2 (MO 2)I/16 and I/20
 Leeds - Leeds Inner Ring Road (inner city), Leeds Outer Ring Road (suburbs)
 London – London Inner Ring Road (inner city), North Circular Road and South Circular Road (inner suburbs), M25 motorway (metropolitan region)
 Lisbon – 2ª Circular (Inner City), IC17-CRIL (City Proper), IC18/A9-CREL (Metropolitan Region)
 Lyon – A7 autoroute and A46 autoroute (city proper)
 Ljubljana – Ljubljana Ring Road
 Madrid – M-30 (inner city), M-40 (inner metropolitan region), M-50 (outer metropolitan region, incomplete)
 Manchester – Manchester Inner Ring Road (inner city), M60 motorway (metropolitan region)
 Milan – A4 motorway, A50 (West), A51 (East), A52 (North) and A58 (Outer Eastern) bypass roads, Circolare Esterna (periphery ring road), Circonvallazione (ring road around the centre), Cerchia Interna (ring road in the city centre)
 Minsk – M9
 Moscow – Boulevard Ring, Garden Ring, Third Ring Road, Moscow Ring Road (opened in 1961)
 Munich – Altstadtring (inner city), Bundesautobahn 99 (inner metropolitan region)
 Naples – Tangenziale di Napoli
 Oslo – Ring 1, Ring 2 and Ring 3
 Oxford – Oxford Ring Road
 Paris – Boulevard Périphérique (city proper), A86 autoroute (inner metropolitan region), Francilienne (tertiary ring road), Grand contournement de Paris (metropolitan region)
 Padua – GRAP
 Palma de Mallorca – Ma-20 (Vía de Cintura)
 Prague – outer - D0 and inner Městský okruh
 Poznań – outer ring: expressway S11, motorway A2 (concurrent with S5 and S11), expressway S5; inner rings: 1st – partially completed, 2nd – completed, partially concurrent with national road 92 and voivodeship roads 196 and 433, 3rd – planned
 Rennes – Rocade de Rennes (city proper)
 Rome – Grande Raccordo Anulare
 Sofia – Sofia Ring Road
 Saint-Petersburg – Saint Petersburg Ring Road
 Tampere – Tampere Ring Road
 Thessaloniki – Thessaloniki Inner Ring Road
 Venice – Tangenziale di Venezia
 Vienna – Vienna Ring Road (inner city), Vienna Beltway (outer districts)
 Vigo – VG-20 (Vigo Ring Road)
 Warsaw – Expressway S2, Expressway S7, Expressway S8, Expressway S17 (planned stretch)
 Wroclaw - Outer ring: Autostrada A4, Autostrada A8, Expressway S8,  (in construction). Inner ring: National road 5, 
 Zagreb – Zagreb bypass
 Zillina - I/60 Mestky okruch

In Iceland, there is a 1,332 km ring road, called the ring road (or Route 1), around most of the island (excluding only the remote Westfjords). Most of the country's settlements are on or near this road.

Asia-Pacific

Major cities that are served by a ring road or ring road system:
 Australia: Sydney (Sydney Orbital Network), Canberra, Brisbane, Perth and Melbourne have ring roads.
 Afghanistan, Ring Road, a 2200km long road circulating inside the country, and connects most of Afghanistan's major cities, such as Kabul, Ghazni, Kandahar, Herat and Mazar-i-Sharif.
 Ahmedabad, India - Sardar Patel Ring Road
 Ankara, Turkey - Otoyol 20
 Bangkok, Thailand - Ratchadaphisek Road (Inner Ring Road) and Kanchanaphisek Road (Outer Ring Road)
 Beijing, China - six ring roads encircling the city.
 Bengaluru, India - Inner Ring Road and Outer Ring Road
 Christchurch, New Zealand - Christchurch Ring Road includes parts of State Highways 1, 74, and 76. The "Four Avenues" (Bealey Avenue, Fitzgerald Avenue, Moorhouse Avenue, and Deans Avenue) serve as an inner ring around the central city.
 Delhi, India - Inner Ring Road, Delhi and Outer Ring Road, Delhi
 Erbil, Iraq - Four ring roads circulating through/around the city.
 Fukuoka, Japan - Fukuoka Expressway Circular Route
 George Town, Malaysia - George Town Inner Ring Road, Penang Middle Ring Road
 Hawaii Island, Hawaii - Hawaii Belt Road
 Hong Kong, Hong Kong - Route 9 (New Territories Circular Road)
 Hyderabad, India - Outer Ring Road, Hyderabad
 Jakarta, Indonesia - Jakarta Inner Ring Road, Jakarta Outer Ring Road, Jakarta Outer Ring Road 2 
 Kathmandu, Nepal - Kathmandu Ringroad
 Kuala Lumpur, Malaysia - Kuala Lumpur Inner Ring Road, Kuala Lumpur Middle Ring Road 1, Kuala Lumpur Middle Ring Road 2, Kuala Lumpur Outer Ring Road
 Lahore, Pakistan - Lahore Ring Road
 Manila, Philippines - EDSA, Circumferential Road 5
 Medina, Saudi Arabia - King Faisal Road (1st Ring Road) and King Abdullah Road (2nd Ring Road)
 Nagoya, Japan - C1 Inner Ring Route Expressway, C2 Second Ring Route Expressway, C3 Third Ring Route Expressway, Japan National Route 302, Nagoya Municipal Road Nagoya Inner Ring
 Osaka, Japan - Loop Route
 Peshawar, Pakistan - Peshawar Ring Road
 Riyadh, Saudi Arabia - Riyadh Ring Road
 Sendai, Japan - Gurutto Sendai
 Seoul, South Korea - Seoul Ring Expressway
 Shanghai, China - Inner Ring Road, Middle Ring Road, S20 Outer Ring Expressway, G1501 Shanghai Ring Expressway
 Singapore, Singapore - Outer Ring Road System
 Tianjin, China - Inner, Middle and Outer Ring Roads
 Tokyo, Japan - C1 Inner Circular Expressway, C2 Central Circular Expressway, C3 Gaikan Expressway, C4 Ken-Ō Expressway, CA Tokyo Bay Aqua-Line/B Bayshore Route, Yokohama Ring Expressway, Japan National Route 16, Japan National Route 298, Japan National Route 357, Japan National Route 468
 Hanoi, Vietnam - Ringway 3

Africa
 Addis Ababa, Ethiopia - Addis Ababa Ring Road
 Bloemfontein, South Africa - Bloemfontein Ring Road
 Cairo, Egypt - Ring Road (Cairo)
 Durban, South Africa - Durban Outer Ring Road
 Johannesburg, South Africa - Johannesburg Ring Road
 Nairobi, Kenya - Ring road, Kisumu City, Kenya Ring road
 Polokwane, South Africa - Polokwane Ring Road
 Pretoria, South Africa - Pretoria Ring Road

See also
 Circumferential Highway
 Downtown circulator
 Link road
 List of ring roads
 Circle route, a public transport route forming a circle

References

Types of roads